The Liberty Theater is a historic vaudeville theater and cinema in Astoria, Oregon, United States. The whole commercial building of which the theater is the major occupant is also known as the Astor Building, especially in the context of historic preservation.

History
Opened in 1925 as the first theater to be re-established after the destruction of the Astoria fire of 1922, the Liberty Theater was seen as symbolizing the city's rebirth. Its Italian Renaissance architectural and decorative style was unique among Astoria's commercial buildings and stood out from the rest of the post-fire reconstruction. Notably, the auditorium features a set of 12 mural-style oil-on-canvas paintings depicting Venetian canal scenes by local artist Joseph Knowles, extending the Mediterranean atmosphere of the architecture. The building was built for the theater chain of Claude Jensen and John von Herberg, one of over thirty venues they operated throughout the Pacific Northwest, and was designed by the Portland architectural firm of Bennes and Herzog.

The building was added to the National Register of Historic Places in 1984 using the Astor Building name.

See also
National Register of Historic Places listings in Clatsop County, Oregon

Notes

References

External links

1925 establishments in Oregon
Renaissance Revival architecture in Oregon
National Register of Historic Places in Astoria, Oregon
Historic district contributing properties in Oregon
Commercial buildings on the National Register of Historic Places in Oregon